Steel Slovakia aréna is a multi-use stadium in Moldava nad Bodvou, Slovakia.  It is currently used mostly for football matches and is the home ground of FK Bodva Moldava nad Bodvou.  The stadium holds 2,500 people.

External links 
Stadium website 

Football venues in Slovakia
Buildings and structures in Košice Region
Sport in Košice Region